Results from Norwegian football in 1926.

Class A of local association leagues
Class A of local association leagues (kretsserier) is the predecessor of a national league competition.

Norwegian Cup

Final

National team

Sources:

References

   
Seasons in Norwegian football